The 60th Alabama Infantry Regiment was an infantry regiment of the Confederate States Army during the American Civil War. The regiment was formed on November 25, 1863 at Charleston, Tennessee by consolidating four companies of the 1st Battalion and the 3rd Battalion, Hilliard's Alabama Legion. 

The regiment served in Gracie's Alabama Brigade in the Department of East Tennessee and later the Army of Northern Virginia.

The regiment surrendered at Appomattox Courthouse on April 9, 1865.

See also
List of Alabama Civil War Confederate units

Notes

References
 Lewellyn A. Shaver History of the Sixtieth Alabama Regiment, Gracie's Alabama Brigade
 Stewart Sifakis. Compendium of the Confederate Armies: Alabama. Facts on File, NY 1992 

Units and formations of the Confederate States Army from Alabama
1863 establishments in Tennessee
1865 disestablishments in Virginia
Military units and formations disestablished in 1865